The Best in Heritage is an international, annual survey of award-winning museum, heritage and conservation projects. The survey was launched in 2003 by the European Heritage Association from Zagreb under leadership from professor Tomislav S. Šola. The event is being held every year in the city of Dubrovnik, Croatia at the end of September. The aim of the conference is to give prize winning projects from the preceding year further professional and media attention. The event serves to identify and promote the best museum, heritage and conservation projects in the world.

The event 
The Best in Heritage is an annual presentation of awarded museum, heritage, and conservation projects. Over 40 hand-picked projects and institutions which have received national or international awards in the previous year are presented by their authors or institution directors, followed by discussions, exhibitions and receptions. Presenters explain why their achievements were proclaimed the best in the previous year and received an award. The aim is to present quality projects in anything concerning the care and communication of heritage.

IMAGINES 
At the IMAGINES event New technologies and Multimedia projects are being presented in a one-day programme.

Patronage 
The conference is organised in partnership with Europa Nostra. The main patron is the ICOM Fund of the International Council of Museums (ICOM), other patrons are: ICOMOS, ICCROM, International Federation of Library Associations, the City of Dubrovnik and the Croatian Ministry of Culture. The Museums of Dubrovnik are local partner.

Projects of Influence 
From 2015 onward, the conference audience, together with moderators and last year's winners, votes for the "Project of influence" award for each of the two events, winners of which are announced at the closing ceremony.

References

External links 
The Best in Heritage website
The Best in Heritage YouTube Channel
Europa Nostra website

Museum events
International conferences
Cultural heritage
European culture
Conservation and restoration of cultural heritage
Architectural conservation
2003 establishments in Croatia